Guido Stagnaro (Sestri Levante, Liguria, Italy, 20 January 1925 – Milan, Italy, 18 February 2021) was an Italian film director (I cinque del quinto piano), screenwriter (In Love, Every Pleasure Has Its Pain), television writer, and writer. He was co-creator of Topo Gigio. 

Stagnaro died from COVID-19 during the COVID-19 pandemic in Italy.

References

External links 

1925 births
2021 deaths
Italian directors
Italian screenwriters
People from the Province of Genoa
Writers from Liguria
Deaths from the COVID-19 pandemic in Lombardy